In geometry, an equilateral triangle is a triangle in which all three sides have the same length. In the familiar Euclidean geometry, an equilateral triangle is also equiangular; that is, all three internal angles are also congruent to each other and are each 60°. It is also a regular polygon, so it is also referred to as a regular triangle.

Principal properties

The area is 
The perimeter is 
The radius of the circumscribed circle is 
The geometric center of the triangle is the center of the circumscribed and inscribed circles
The altitude (height) from any side is 

Denoting the radius of the circumscribed circle as R, we can determine using trigonometry that:
The area of the triangle is 
Many of these quantities have simple relationships to the altitude ("h") of each vertex from the opposite side:
The area is 
The height of the center from each side, or apothem, is 
The radius of the circle circumscribing the three vertices is 
The radius of the inscribed circle is 

In an equilateral triangle, the altitudes, the angle bisectors, the perpendicular bisectors, and the medians to each side coincide.

Characterizations

Thus these are properties that are unique to equilateral triangles, and knowing that any one of them is true directly implies that we have an equilateral triangle.

Sides

Semiperimeter
 (Blundon)

Angles

Area
 (Weitzenböck)

Circumradius, inradius, and exradii
 (Chapple-Euler)

Equal cevians
Three kinds of cevians coincide, and are equal, for (and only for) equilateral triangles:
The three altitudes have equal lengths.
The three medians have equal lengths.
The three angle bisectors have equal lengths.

Coincident triangle centers
Every triangle center of an equilateral triangle coincides with its centroid, which implies that the equilateral triangle is the only triangle with no Euler line connecting some of the centers. For some pairs of triangle centers, the fact that they coincide is enough to ensure that the triangle is equilateral. In particular:

A triangle is equilateral if any two of the circumcenter, incenter, centroid, or orthocenter coincide.
It is also equilateral if its circumcenter coincides with the Nagel point, or if its incenter coincides with its nine-point center.

Six triangles formed by partitioning by the medians

For any triangle, the three medians partition the triangle into six smaller triangles.
A triangle is equilateral if and only if any three of the smaller triangles have either the same perimeter or the same inradius.
A triangle is equilateral if and only if the circumcenters of any three of the smaller triangles have the same distance from the centroid.

Points in the plane

Notable theorems

Morley's trisector theorem states that, in any triangle, the three points of intersection of the adjacent angle trisectors form an equilateral triangle.

Napoleon's theorem states that, if equilateral triangles are constructed on the sides of any triangle, either all outward, or all inward, the centers of those equilateral triangles themselves form an equilateral triangle.

A version of the isoperimetric inequality for triangles states that the triangle of greatest area among all those with a given perimeter is equilateral.

That is, and  satisfy the triangle inequality that the sum of any two of them is greater than the third. If  is on the circumcircle then the sum of the two smaller ones equals the longest and the triangle has degenerated into a line, this case is known as Van Schooten's theorem.

Geometric construction

An equilateral triangle is easily constructed using a straightedge and compass, because 3 is a Fermat prime. Draw a straight line, and place the point of the compass on one end of the line, and swing an arc from that point to the other point of the line segment. Repeat with the other side of the line. Finally, connect the point where the two arcs intersect with each end of the line segment

An alternative method is to draw a circle with radius , place the point of the compass on the circle and draw another circle with the same radius. The two circles will intersect in two points. An equilateral triangle can be constructed by taking the two centers of the circles and either of the points of intersection.

In both methods a by-product is the formation of vesica piscis.

The proof that the resulting figure is an equilateral triangle is the first proposition in Book I of Euclid's Elements.

Derivation of area formula
The area formula  in terms of side length  can be derived directly using the Pythagorean theorem or using trigonometry.

Using the Pythagorean theorem
The area of a triangle is half of one side  times the height  from that side:

The legs of either right triangle formed by an altitude of the equilateral triangle are half of the base , and the hypotenuse is the side  of the equilateral triangle. The height of an equilateral triangle can be found using the Pythagorean theorem

so that

Substituting  into the area formula  gives the area formula for the equilateral triangle:

Using trigonometry

Each angle of an equilateral triangle is 60°, so

Thus

since all sides of an equilateral triangle are equal.

Other properties

An equilateral triangle is the most symmetrical triangle, having 3 lines of reflection and rotational symmetry of order 3 about its center, whose symmetry group is the dihedral group of order 6, . The integer-sided equilateral triangle is the only triangle with integer sides, and three rational angles as measured in degrees. It is the only acute triangle that is similar to its orthic triangle (with vertices at the feet of the altitudes), and the only triangle whose Steiner inellipse is a circle (specifically, the incircle). The triangle of largest area of all those inscribed in a given circle is equilateral, and the triangle of smallest area of all those circumscribed around a given circle is also equilateral. It is the only regular polygon aside from the square that can be inscribed inside any other regular polygon. 

By Euler's inequality, the equilateral triangle has the smallest ratio of the circumradius  to the inradius  of any triangle, with

Given a point  in the interior of an equilateral triangle, the ratio of the sum of its distances from the vertices to the sum of its distances from the sides is greater than or equal to 2, equality holding when  is the centroid. In no other triangle is there a point for which this ratio is as small as 2. There are numerous other triangle inequalities that hold with equality if and only if the triangle is equilateral.

which also equals  if  and

which is the optic equation.

For an equilateral triangle:

The ratio of its area to the area of the incircle, is the largest of any triangle.

The ratio of its area to the square of its perimeter,  is larger than that of any non-equilateral triangle.

Notably, the equilateral triangle tiles two dimensional space with six triangles meeting at a vertex, whose dual tessellation is the hexagonal tiling. 3.122, 3.4.6.4, (3.6)2, 32.4.3.4, and 34.6 are all semi-regular tessellations constructed with equilateral triangles. 

In three dimensions, equilateral triangles form faces of regular and uniform polyhedra. Three of the five Platonic solids are composed of equilateral triangles: the tetrahedron, octahedron and icosahedron. In particular, the tetrahedron, which has four equilateral triangles for faces, can be considered the three-dimensional analogue of the triangle. All Platonic solids can inscribe tetrahedra, as well as be inscribed inside tetrahedra. Equilateral triangles also form uniform antiprisms as well as uniform star antiprisms in three-dimensional space. For antiprisms, two (non-mirrored) parallel copies of regular polygons are connected by alternating bands of  equilateral triangles. Specifically for star antiprisms, there are prograde and retrograde (crossed) solutions that join mirrored and non-mirrored parallel star polygons. The Platonic octahedron is also a triangular antiprism, which is the first true member of the infinite family of antiprisms (the tetrahedron, as a digonal antiprism, is sometimes considered the first).

In culture and society
Equilateral triangles have frequently appeared in man made constructions:
The shape occurs in modern architecture such as the cross-section of the Gateway Arch.
Its applications in flags and heraldry includes the flag of Nicaragua and the flag of the Philippines.
It is a shape of a variety of road signs, including the yield sign.

See also
Almost-equilateral Heronian triangle
Isosceles triangle
Ternary plot
Trilinear coordinates

References

External links

Types of triangles
Constructible polygons